Karen Maine is an American film director and screenwriter known for Obvious Child and Yes, God, Yes.

Career

Maine co-wrote the 2014 film Obvious Child and the 2009 short film it's based on.

Maine wrote and directed the 2020 film Yes, God, Yes starring Natalia Dyer. The film is based on Maine's experiences growing up in Iowa and attending Catholic school for 15 years, where she received a sex-ed curriculum that emphasized not having sex before marriage. Yes, God, Yes premiered at the 2019 SXSW Film Festival and won a Special Jury Award for Best Ensemble. It was released by Vertical Entertainment via virtual theaters on July 24, 2020 and on VOD on July 28, 2020. The film received positive reviews from critics. Richard Brody of The New Yorker said that "Maine uses meticulously composed yet freely imaginative visual and sonic textures to develop the film into a vivid, varied comedic drama and an intricate portrayal of inner experience", Katie Walsh of the Los Angeles Times said that "Maine's film captures something indelible about adolescent female desire, without condescending or objectifying, because she understands, subjectively, what that looks and feels like: all the confusion and shame, but yes, also the pleasure", and Richard Roeper of The Chicago Sun-Times wrote Yes, God, Yes "retains a breezy and upbeat and even sweet disposition, thanks to the light touch of writer-director Karen Maine and an absolutely winning performance by Stranger Things star Natalia Dyer." The film holds a 93% approval rating on review aggregator website Rotten Tomatoes, based on 126 reviews. It was included on The New Yorker's list of the best films of 2020.

Maine directed the pilot and the first season of the BBC Three/HBO Max series Starstruck, created by and starring New Zealand comedian Rose Matafeo.

In May 2021 it was announced that Maine will direct the upcoming 20th-century feature film Rosaline, a modern adaptation of Shakespeare's Romeo and Juliet, starring Kaitlyn Dever as Rosaline, Juliet's cousin and Romeo's first love. It is slated to be released in 2022 on Hulu.

Filmography

References

External links

Living people
American women film directors
American women screenwriters
21st-century American women
1985 births